Timothy Patrick Gleason (born January 29, 1983) is an American former professional ice hockey defenseman and current assistant coach to the Carolina Hurricanes. Drafted by the Ottawa Senators in the first round, 23rd overall, at the 2001 NHL Entry Draft, Gleason played in the NHL for the Los Angeles Kings, Carolina Hurricanes, Toronto Maple Leafs and the Washington Capitals.

Playing career

Amateur
As a youth, Gleason played in the 1996 Quebec International Pee-Wee Hockey Tournament with the Detroit Little Caesars minor ice hockey team.

After a standout junior ice hockey career with the Ontario Hockey League (OHL)'s Windsor Spitfires, Gleason was drafted in the first round, 23rd overall, of the 2001 NHL Entry Draft by the Ottawa Senators. Unable to come to terms on a contract with the Senators, Gleason was subsequently traded to the Los Angeles Kings in exchange for forward Bryan Smolinski on March 11, 2003.

Professional
After spending three years in the Kings organization, Gleason, along with Éric Bélanger, was traded to the Carolina Hurricanes on September 29, 2006, in exchange for defensemen Oleg Tverdovsky and Jack Johnson. Gleason stayed with the Hurricanes until January 1, 2014, when he was acquired by the Toronto Maple Leafs in a trade for John-Michael Liles and Dennis Robertson. On June 30, 2014, however, Gleason was placed on unconditional waivers by the Maple Leafs for the purpose of a contract buyout.

On July 3, 2014, Gleason returned to the Carolina Hurricanes as a free agent, signing a one-year, $1.2 million contract. In the 2014–15 season, Gleason resumed his physical role on the Hurricanes' blueline, appearing in 55 games and registering seven points before he was traded to the Washington Capitals in exchange for Jack Hillen and a fourth-round draft pick in 2015 on February 28, 2015.

International
Gleason played for the United States at the 2010 Winter Olympics in Vancouver, winning a silver medal.

Playing style
Gleason is known for his toughness and gritty play, including the diving effort he made for the Hurricanes to prevent the puck from leaving the offensive zone in Game 7 of the 2009 Eastern Conference Semi-finals against the New Jersey Devils, which ultimately led to a game-tying goal. He also took a puck to the face whilst playing against the Washington Capitals in 2009, but returned to the ice after multiple stitches to eventually score the tying goal on a breakaway.

Career statistics

Regular season and playoffs

International

References

External links

1983 births
American men's ice hockey defensemen
Carolina Hurricanes coaches
Carolina Hurricanes players
Ice hockey players from Michigan
Ice hockey players at the 2010 Winter Olympics
Living people
Los Angeles Kings players
Medalists at the 2010 Winter Olympics
Manchester Monarchs (AHL) players
National Hockey League first-round draft picks
Olympic silver medalists for the United States in ice hockey
Ottawa Senators draft picks
People from Clawson, Michigan
Toronto Maple Leafs players
Washington Capitals players
Windsor Spitfires players